The Regional Council of Champagne-Ardenne was the deliberative assembly of the former region of Champagne-Ardenne incorporated in the Grand Est region on 1 January 2016. It was headquartered in Châlons-en-Champagne, at 5 rue de Jéricho at Hôtel de region de Champagne-Ardenne, from 1982 to 2015.

Presidents of the Regional Council

Composition of the Regional Council (2010-2015) 

The regional council has 49 regional advisers:

 French Communist Party: 6 elected
 Socialist Party: 18 elected
 Europe Ecology: 5 elected
 Union for a Popular Movement - New Center : 14 elected
 National Front: 6 elected

Headquarters 
The Regional Council occupied the old enclosure which consisted of the major and minor seminary of Châlons. The renovation took place in two stages, the first aimed at rehabilitating the major seminary where the council sat for the plenary session and the Economic and Social Council. The garden and the minor seminary were rehabilitated for the beginning of 2015.

References 

Champagne-Ardenne
Champagne-Ardenne